is a former Japanese football player.

Playing career
Inagaki was born in Shizuoka Prefecture on April 24, 1970. After graduating from Hosei University, he joined Japan Football League club Yanmar Diesel (later Cerezo Osaka) in 1993. He played many matches as center back. The club won the champions in 1994 and was promoted to J1 League. However his opportunity to play decreased from 1996. In 1999, he moved to Japan Football League club Yokohama FC. The club won the champions for 2 years in a row (1999-2000). Although the club was promoted to J2 League from 2001, he retired end of 2000 season.

Club statistics

References

External links

1970 births
Living people
Hosei University alumni
Association football people from Shizuoka Prefecture
Japanese footballers
J1 League players
Japan Football League (1992–1998) players
Japan Football League players
Cerezo Osaka players
Yokohama FC players
Association football defenders